The Evidence of the Film is a 1913 American silent short crime film directed by Lawrence Marston and Edwin Thanhouser, starring William Garwood.

The only known copy of this film was rediscovered in 1999 on the floor of the projection booth in a Superior, Montana movie theater.  In 2001, this film was selected for preservation in the United States National Film Registry by the Library of Congress as being "culturally, historically, or aesthetically significant".

Plot

The Evidence of the Film tells the story of a messenger boy (Marie Eline) at a film studio who is framed for the theft of $20,000 in bonds by a broker (William Garwood). The broker plans to have his office staff witness him placing the bonds into an envelope and give it to the messenger boy to deliver to his client. Next, the broker follows the boy, knocks him down "by accident," and switches the original envelope with another filled with newspaper scraps. The broker successfully pulls off his scheme, however, his collision with the messenger occurs in front of a film crew shooting a scene on the streets.

When the boy delivers the newspaper-filled envelope to the client, a widow named Mrs. Caroline Livingston (Helen Badgley), she calls a policeman to arrest the bewildered boy. He calls his sister (Florence LaBadie) for help just before a judge sentences him to time in jail. Fortunately, his sister happens to be a film editor, and she finds the footage the film crew shot of the broker stealing from the boy. The sister delivers the film to the authorities, who arrest the broker and free the messenger boy.

Cast
William Garwood as The Broker
Marie Eline as Messenger Boy
Riley Chamberlin as Clerk
Florence La Badie as Sister of Little Boy
Helen Badgley as Mrs. Caroline Livingstone

References

External links

The Evidence of the Film essay by Ned Thanhouser at National Film Registry 

The Evidence of the Film at the Thanhouser Company Film Preservation, Inc. website
Lobby poster

1913 films
1910s crime films
1913 short films
American crime films
American silent short films
American black-and-white films
Films set in studio lots
Thanhouser Company films
United States National Film Registry films
Articles containing video clips
1910s rediscovered films
Rediscovered American films
Films directed by Lawrence Marston
1910s American films